Secundilactobacillus kimchicus is a rod-shaped species of lactic acid bacteria isolated from kimchi, a Korean dish involving fermented vegetables. It is part of the Lactobacillaceae family. It is Gram-positive, non-spore forming and non-motile prokaryote.

This species grows between 15 and 45 °C and pH 5.0-9.0. Whole-genome sequencing has shown that S. kimchicus has a 2.59 Mbp long genome with 46.6% GC-content.

References

External links 

 Type strain of Lactobacillus kimchicus at BacDive -  the Bacterial Diversity Metadatabase

Lactobacillaceae